Half-Way House, also known as The Wiseburg Inn, is a historic inn and toll house located on York Road at Parkton, Baltimore County, Maryland.  It is a large, -story Flemish bond brick structure. The main part, built as an inn about 1810, was placed in front of an earlier log structure which has since been used as a kitchen. The property includes three of the original outbuildings, a stone dairy, a stone laundry, and a board-and-batten shed / ice house. It was built to serve travelers on the newly opened turnpike from Baltimore to York.

It was listed on the National Register of Historic Places in 1980.  A boundary increase took place in 1989.

References

External links
, including undated photo, at Maryland Historical Trust

Buildings and structures in Baltimore County, Maryland
Hotel buildings on the National Register of Historic Places in Maryland
Hotel buildings completed in 1810
Historic American Buildings Survey in Maryland
Toll houses on the National Register of Historic Places
National Register of Historic Places in Baltimore County, Maryland